Samantha Lefebvre is an American politician. She serves the Orange-1 district in the Vermont House of Representatives.

A Republican, she serves on the House Committee on Government Operations and Government Accountability Committee.

Biography
She graduated from Mount Mansfield Union High School and the Center for Technology.

References

External links
 Official website

Members of the Vermont House of Representatives
Year of birth missing (living people)
Living people
Vermont Republicans